War 3010: The Revolution is a turn-based strategy video game for the Super Nintendo Entertainment System, developed by American studio Advanced Productions, that takes place in the year 3010. It was released in 1996 to an exclusively North American market. It is the sequel to War 2410.

Story

In the years following the victory of humanity over the three other factions in the fateful conflict of 2410, most of the known universe has been occupied by an intergalactic menace known as the Kyllen. Slavery for most of the civilized species only became an unavoidable reality once the freedom-loving citizens lost their political and social autonomy sometime in the year 2610. Even the humans have lost their freedom and must struggle in slavery amongst the rest of the universe.

Gameplay
In order to save humanity (and the rest of the civilized universe), the player must command a battle fleet; which was seized from the Kyllens by a group of human slaves. A space armada can be maintained each level by upgrading the vessels with the newest weapons and gears. Capturing starbases allow new ships to be constructed within a series of turns. The game uses the same strategy game feel as its predecessor, War 2410. Passwords allow players to play various mini-games (i.e., chess and checkers) in addition to restoring their progress in the game.

Reception

In a brief review for GamePro, Scary Larry deemed the game overly complex and said the static graphics and bland music make it dull to play. He gave it a 2.0 out of 5 in every category (graphics, sound, control, and funfactor).

References

1996 video games
North America-exclusive video games
Science fiction video games
Super Nintendo Entertainment System games
Super Nintendo Entertainment System-only games
Turn-based strategy video games
Top-down video games
Video game sequels
Video games developed in the United States
Video games set in the 31st century